Alex Grendi (born July 28, 1987) is an American soccer player.

Career

College
Grendi played college soccer at the University of Pennsylvania. During his college years Grendi also played with Long Island Rough Riders in the USL Premier Development League.

Professional
Grendi was drafted in the third round (45th overall) of the 2009 MLS SuperDraft by the Columbus Crew. He made his professional debut on 21 March 2009, in Crew's first game of the 2009 MLS season against Houston Dynamo, and subsequently played two more MLS games before being cut on March 23, 2010.

Having been released due to a recurring knee injury, Grendi returned to the University of Pennsylvania to finish his degree and play for the Long Island Rough Riders in the USL Premier Development League in 2010.

On April 5, 2011, Grendi signed with Wilmington Hammerheads of the USL Pro league.  On June 6, 2011, Grendi tore his ACL and was unable to play for the remainder of the season.

References

External links
 MLS player profile

1987 births
Living people
American soccer players
Long Island Rough Riders players
Columbus Crew players
Wilmington Hammerheads FC players
Penn Quakers men's soccer players
USL League Two players
Major League Soccer players
USL Championship players
Columbus Crew draft picks
People from Cold Spring Harbor, New York
Soccer players from New York (state)
Association football midfielders